Nancy Jean Shelley (1926–2010) OAM was a Quaker peace activist who represented the Australian peace movement at the United Nations in 1982. She was a prominent speaker at many Australian and international conferences in the 1980s and 1990s. Shelley received a Medal of the Order of Australia (OAM) in 1989 for her work. She died on 28 September 2010.

See also
 List of peace activists

References

2010 deaths
1926 births
Australian Quakers
Australian pacifists
Australian Christian pacifists
Recipients of the Medal of the Order of Australia
Australian anti–nuclear weapons activists